Black Balloon Publishing is an independent book publisher headquartered in New York City. The company was founded in 2010 by Elizabeth Koch, co-founder of Literary Death Match, and Leigh Newman, deputy editor of Oprah.com. Black Balloon publishes literary fiction, nonfiction, and memoir, and its titles have been featured in The New Yorker, New York, Time, Bon Appetit, Esquire, and NPR. Published authors include Paul Kwiatkowski, Robert Perišić, Bill Peters, and Louise Krug.

References

External links 
 

Small press publishing companies
2010 establishments in New York City
Companies based in New York City